Harry Hunter Seldomridge (October 1, 1864 – November 2, 1927) was a U.S. Representative from Colorado.

Biography
Born in Philadelphia, Pennsylvania, Seldomridge attended the public schools of Philadelphia. He moved to Colorado Springs, Colorado, in February 1878. He graduated from Colorado College at Colorado Springs in 1885. He worked as the City editor of the Colorado Springs Gazette from 1886 to 1888. He engaged in the grain and hay business in 1888. He served as delegate to the Democratic National Convention in 1896. He served as member of the State senate 1896–1904. He served as member and president of the State charter convention at Colorado Springs in 1909.

Seldomridge was elected as a Democrat to the Sixty-third Congress (March 4, 1913 – March 3, 1915). He was an unsuccessful candidate for reelection in 1914 to the Sixty-fourth Congress. He resumed his former business pursuits, and served as Receiver of the Mercantile National Bank of Pueblo from 1915–1923. He was appointed public trustee of El Paso County, Colorado, by Governor William Sweet. He died at Colorado Springs, Colorado, November 2, 1927. He was interred in Evergreen Cemetery.

References

External links 

1864 births
1927 deaths
Democratic Party members of the United States House of Representatives from Colorado
Democratic Party Colorado state senators
Burials at Evergreen Cemetery (Colorado Springs, Colorado)